"Smiley Faces" is a song by American soul music duo Gnarls Barkley from their debut album, St. Elsewhere (2006). It was released July 17, 2006, as the second single from that album in the United Kingdom and peaked at number 10 on the UK Singles Chart.

Music videos
Like the single "Crazy", there are two different music videos for this song.

The mockumentary-style music video for "Smiley Faces", directed by Robert Hales shows a music historian (played by Dennis Hopper) and an A&R executive (played by Dean Stockwell) being interviewed about whether or not Gnarls Barkley (the person) exists and pondering over whether Barkley is behind the music scene. The video shows musical acts and cultural events from the 1920s to the 1990s, with Cee-Lo and producer Danger Mouse in the background. The effect is similar to that of Woody Allen editing himself into archival film footage in Zelig. (Danger Mouse has spoken of Woody Allen's films, and Allen's auteur approach as having an influence on his music.) In September 2007, the video won an MTV Video Music Award for Best Editing.

There was another music video made directed by Marc Klasfeld and animated by Edgar Reyes, featuring an instant messaging smiley with a gangster smileys' wife (who takes her top off for him), going to a sex dungeon, killing the gangster with a chainsaw, getting arrested and sent to prison, getting broken out of prison by the gangsters' wife, being at a Gnarls Barkley concert (who were also both in smiley form), drinking a lot and being sick, going home with the gangsters wife and then her getting three of her topless friends, with the main smiley being very happy. This video was originally put on British music channels before the mockumentary video but was banned due to sexual content and violence.

Track listings
UK CD1
 "Smiley Faces"
 "Smiley Faces" (live on Later with Jools Holland)

UK CD2
 "Smiley Faces" (radio edit)
 "Go-Go Gadget Gospel"
 "Crazy" (video)
 "Exclusive Microsite"

UK 12-inch vinyl
 "Smiley Faces"
 "Go-Go Gadget Gospel"
 "Smiley Faces" (instrumental)

Chart performance
The song entered the UK Official Download Chart on May 3, 2006, at number 152. It reached its peak at number 12 on July 9, 2006. It then entered the UK Singles Chart on July 16, 2006, at number 23 based on download sales alone, climbing to number 10 after the physical release was available.

Weekly charts

Year-end charts

Release history

References

2006 singles
2006 songs
Gnarls Barkley songs
Music videos directed by Marc Klasfeld
Music videos directed by Robert Hales
Song recordings produced by Danger Mouse (musician)
Songs written by CeeLo Green
Songs written by Danger Mouse (musician)
Warner Music Group singles